Carpineto Sinello is a comune and town in the province of Chieti in the Abruzzo region of central-southern Italy.

Main sights
Ducal Castle
Museum of Swine
Church of San Michele Arcangelo

References

 
Cities and towns in Abruzzo